Lahe Township  is a township located within the Naga Self-Administered Zone of Sagaing Division, Myanmar. The principal town is Lahe.

Towns and villages

Languages
The following languages are spoken in Lahe Township.
Kyan, Karyaw (northwestern part of township, bordering Tirap district, Arunachal Pradesh, India)
Law (northwestern part of township, bordering Mon district, Nagaland, India)
Lainong (main town and central part of township)
Makyan (eastern part of township)
Tangshang varieties (eastern part of township)
Ponyo, Gongwang (south-central part of township)
Khemyungan (southern part of township)
Makuri (southernmost part of township)

References

 
Townships of Sagaing Region